The Pohatcong Township School District is a comprehensive community public school district that serves students in pre-kindergarten through eighth grade from Pohatcong Township, in Warren County, New Jersey, United States.

As of the 2018–19 school year, the district, comprising one school, had an enrollment of 304 students and 30.3 classroom teachers (on an FTE basis), for a student–teacher ratio of 10.0:1.

The district is classified by the New Jersey Department of Education as being in District Factor Group "DE", the fifth-highest of eight groupings by common socioeconomic characteristics.

Public school students in ninth through twelfth grades attend Phillipsburg High School in Phillipsburg, which serves students from the Town of Phillipsburg as part of a sending/receiving relationship with the Phillipsburg School District. The high school also serves students from four other sending communities: Alpha, Bloomsbury (in Hunterdon County), Greenwich Township and Lopatcong Township. As of the 2018–19 school year, the high school had an enrollment of 1,650 students and 126.5 classroom teachers (on an FTE basis), for a student–teacher ratio of 13.0:1.

Schools
Schools in the district (with 2018–19 enrollment data from the National Center for Education Statistics) are:
Pohatcong Township Elementary School for Pre-K to grade 8 (302 students)
Keith Kullman, Principal

Administration
Core members of the districts' administration are:
Diane Mandry, Superintendent
Tim Mantz, Business Administrator / Board Secretary

Board of education
The district's board of education, with nine members, sets policy and oversees the fiscal and educational operation of the district through its administration. As a Type II school district, the board's trustees are elected directly by voters to serve three-year terms of office on a staggered basis, with three seats up for election each year held (since 2012) as part of the November general election. The board appoints a superintendent to oversee the day-to-day operation of the district.

References

External links
Pohatcong Township School District

School Data for the Pohatcong Township School District, National Center for Education Statistics
Phillipsburg High School

Pohatcong Township, New Jersey
New Jersey District Factor Group B
School districts in Warren County, New Jersey
Public K–8 schools in New Jersey